Chaetogaedia is a genus of flies in the family Tachinidae.

Species
C. analis (Wulp, 1867)
C. crebra (Wulp, 1890)
C. desertorum (Townsend, 1908)
C. filialis (Reinhard, 1945)
C. monticola (Bigot, 1887)
C. rufifrons (Wulp, 1890)
C. townsendi Sabrosky & Arnaud, 1965

References

Diptera of North America
Exoristinae
Tachinidae genera
Taxa named by Friedrich Moritz Brauer
Taxa named by Julius von Bergenstamm